The 2022 season for  is the 24th season in the team's existence and the sixth under the current name. The team has been a UCI WorldTeam since 2005, when the tier was first established. They use Colnago bicycles, Campagnolo drivetrain, Campagnolo wheels and GOBIK clothing.

Team roster 

Riders who joined the team for the 2022 season

Riders who left the team during or after the 2021 season

Season victories

National, Continental, and World Champions

Notes

References

External links 

 

UAE Team Emirates
2022
UAE Team Emirates